Pachyneuria is a genus of skippers in the family Hesperiidae found from Mexico to South America.

Species
Listed alphabetically

Pachyneuria damon (Bell, 1937)
Pachyneuria duidae (Bell, 1932)
Pachyneuria helena (Hayward, 1939)
Pachyneuria inops (Mabille, 1877)
Pachyneuria jaguar Evans, 1953
Pachyneuria lineatopunctata (Mabille & Boullet, 1917)
Pachyneuria milleri Steinhauser, 1989
Pachyneuria obscura Mabille, 1888

References

Natural History Museum Lepidoptera genus database

Carcharodini
Hesperiidae genera
Taxa named by Paul Mabille